Xabier Agirre López (8 April 1951 – 13 February 2021), was a Spanish administrator and politician.

Biography
Xabier Agirre was born in Vitoria-Gasteiz in 1951. He worked in a local savings bank before entering politics. He joined the Basque Nationalist Party in the 1970s, being the head of the Álava branch from 1983 to 1987. That year he was elected to the General Assembly of Álava, in which he served until 1989. From 1990 to 1999, he served as deputy head of the Interior Department of the Basque Government under Juan María Atutxa.

He was the leading candidate of the Basque Nationalist Party in the 2007 election in Álava. Despite his party finishing third, he was unexpectedly elected Deputy General with the support of Eusko Alkartasuna due to the lack of an agreement between the Socialist Party and the People's Party. In late 2009, a corruption scandal broke out involving Alfredo de Miguel, a member of his government. Despite the local party organs having access to the case summary once it was made public, he didn't gain access to it, which strained the relation between the local party leadership and him.

His party finished second in the 2011 election, behind the People's Party. Despite having the support from Bildu, the abstention of Ezker Batua in the investiture vote meant that the PP-PSE-EE alliance had more votes, and thus Javier de Andrés was elected his successor. According to Agirre, Ezker Batua had demanded the naming of party members to public positions in exchange for their support.

From 2012 to 2016 he served as a member of the Basque Parliament and as head of the party in Álava. He died in Pamplona in 2021, aged 69.

References

1951 births
2021 deaths
People from Vitoria-Gasteiz
Politicians from the Basque Country (autonomous community)
Basque Nationalist Party politicians
Deputies General of Álava
Members of the 7th Basque Parliament
Members of the 8th Basque Parliament
Members of the 10th Basque Parliament